Damon is an unincorporated community in Brown County, Illinois, United States. Damon is northwest of Mount Sterling and northeast of Mound Station.

History
A post office was established in 1894, and remained in operation until 1907. The origin of the name Damon is obscure.

References

Unincorporated communities in Brown County, Illinois
Unincorporated communities in Illinois
1894 establishments in Illinois